Paul Dudley Walden (6 June 1964 – 28 December 2015), better known as Guru Josh, was a Jersey musician, active in the British post-acid house scene, best known for his debut single "Infinity".

Biography

Musical career
Walden was the son of a Jersey dentist, Harold Walden. After studying dentistry himself in 1981, he began his career as an entertainer and keyboard player at the Sands nightclub in Jersey, performing under the name of Syndrone and Animal and his Crazy Organs. In 1988, Walden tried ecstasy for the first time at a London pub where he was playing a gig with his rock band Joshua Cries Wolf, subsequently switching from rock to house music.

In 1989, Guru Josh released "Infinity" also known as "Infinity (1990's... Time for the Guru)", from his debut album Infinity. The song was originally produced for a friend of Guru Josh's who was organising a warehouse party of the same name, and gained attention when it started to be played by Haçienda DJ Mike Pickering. The song achieved success in Europe, especially in Germany, the UK, Portugal and Austria. The song was later re-mixed and re-released on multiple occasions (the most popular remix by Klaas), still receiving particular success in 2011.

Guru Josh released several other singles in the 1990s including "Freaky Dreamer", "Holographic Dreams", and "Whose Law (Is It Anyway?)", which reached number 26 and number 12 in the UK and Germany, respectively. "Hallelujah" was released in 1991. Shortly after this, Guru Josh diversified into also doing multimedia production creating the Dance in Cyberspace series of music videos under the name of Dr. Devious and also VR, in collaboration with Darrel Jameson, Guy Labbé, Dave 'Pointy shoes, smart trousers and a baseball vest ' Evans, Marcus Pennell and others.

Following the success of "Infinity", Guru Josh moved to Ibiza, concentrating on art and running a promotions company.

In 2007, he was part of Guru Josh Project, formed by Darren Bailie and signed by Big City Beats. The group consisted of Paul Walden, Anders Nyman, and Darren Bailie. In 2008, "Infinity" was re-released as "Infinity 2008", which was remixed by the German DJ Klaas. It experienced widespread success, peaking at number one on the Belgian, Dutch, French and Danish singles charts, the Czech airplay chart and the Eurochart Hot 100.

In 2010, he released a new single entitled "Frozen Teardrops". In March 2011, he released "Love of Life", with a more modern and punchy house style, and it has been remixed by Sgt Slick, Digital Freq, and The Fusion & DJ Dima June.

In 2012, saw the release of a remix of the 1989 original of "Infinity" called "Infinity 2012" by Guru Josh, with the main remix done by DJ Antoine. This single was then used by Langnese for a large marketing campaign promoting a new product launch during the summer of 2012 in Germany, Austria and Switzerland.

Guru Josh created 3D glass art under the name of "Louie Fabrix", sold in small exhibitions in New York, Madrid, Paris and Berlin.

Death
Walden committed suicide on 28 December 2015 at the age of 51. Associates said Josh had been suffering from drug and alcohol addictions, as well as depression following a break-up with his girlfriend.

Discography

Studio albums

Singles

References

External links

 Guru Josh at Discogs
 The Guru Josh Project at Discogs

1964 births
2015 deaths
Acid house musicians
British electronic musicians
British record producers
British expatriates in Spain
Jersey musicians
Suicides in Spain
2015 suicides